Santiago District is one of fourteen districts of the province Ica in Peru.

References

1870 establishments in Peru